All Cried Out may refer to:

 "All Cried Out" (Alison Moyet song), notably covered by No Angels
 "All Cried Out" (Blonde song)
 "All Cried Out" (Kree Harrison song)
 "All Cried Out" (Lisa Lisa and Cult Jam song), notably covered by Allure
"All Cried Out", song by	 Dusty Springfield
"All Cried Out", song by Gary Benson
"All Cried Out", song by Lamont Dozier
"All Cried Out", song by Lena Martell
"All Cried Out", song by	 Margie Joseph